Shad Khal (also Romanized as Shād Khāl; also known as Shāh Khāl and Shākhāl) is a village in Molla Sara Rural District, in the Central District of Shaft County, Gilan Province, Iran. At the 2006 census, its population was 822, in 193 families.

References 

Populated places in Shaft County